Aagaardia is a genus of fly in the Chironomidae family. Aagaardia has been found in Finland, the mainland of Norway and Russia.

Species
There are five species described within this genus.

Aagaardia longicalcis Sæther 2000
Aagaardia oksanae Makarchenko & Makarchenko 2005
Aagaardia protensa Sæther 2000
Aagaardia sivertseni (Aagaard, 1979); also known as Eukiefferiella sivertseni (Aagaard, 1979)
Aagaardia triangulata Sæther, 2000

References

Further reading
A new species, Aagaardia oksanae sp. n. (Diptera, Chironomidae, Orthocladiinae) from Sikhote-Alin' Biosphere Nature Reserve. Evraziatskii Entomologicheskii Zhurnal, 4(3), Sentyabr 2005: 235-236. [Zoological Record Volume 142]
Aagaardia, a new Holarctic orthoclad genus (Diptera: Chironomidae). Aquatic Insects, 22(3), July 2000: 177-196.  [Zoological Record Volume 136]
New records of chironomids (Diptera, Chironomidae) in the Russian Far East I. subfamily Orthocladiinae.

Chironomidae
Chironomoidea genera